Rollin Charles Richmond was the president of Humboldt State University in Arcata, California from May 2002 to July 2014. Before taking that position he was provost and genetics professor at Iowa State University, leading research on the genetic mechanisms of fruit flies evolution and effects of cocaine on Drosophila. He has also served in various positions at the State University of New York at Stony Brook, the University of South Florida, and Indiana University.

The November 7, 2007 issue of the Humboldt State University weekly student-run paper, The Lumberjack, reported that the Academic Senate at HSU voted by 56% to issue a vote of no confidence in Rollin Richmond's leadership.

Under his leadership Humboldt State University was recently reaccredited for ten years (maximum possible) by the Western Association of Schools and Colleges.  They noted that significant change must occur at Humboldt State including a reformulation of shared governance.

References

External links
Richmond's abridged curriculum vitae

Living people
California State Polytechnic University, Humboldt people
Iowa State University faculty
Stony Brook University faculty
University of South Florida faculty
Indiana University faculty
Heads of universities and colleges in the United States
American geneticists
Year of birth missing (living people)